Fry, Drew and Partners was an architectural practice established by UK architects Maxwell Fry and Jane Drew.

History
Fry, Drew and Partners was formally created in 1950 from the 'Office of Maxwell Fry and Jane Drew' (established 1946). From 1952 the partnership was expanded to include Lindsey Drake and Denys Lasdun as Fry, Drew, Drake and Lasdun.

Based in London, the partnership gained commissions from within the UK, as well as worldwide - in particular former British Colonies in Africa, as well as the middle east, and India - Fry and Drew were key figures in the development of the governmental complex at Chandigarh, India.

Projects
Studio at Hertingfordbury, Herts
Studio at Rowlant, Sussex
Studio at Longpont-sur-Orge, near Paris
Woodsford Square, Kensington, London 1967-74

References

Sources

Further reading

Modernist architects from England
Architecture firms based in London
Defunct companies of England